Myllocerus subfasciatus, is a species of weevil found in India, and Sri Lanka. The Sri Lankan population was earlier identified as a separate species, Myllocerus spurcatus.

Description
Adult weevil light greyish to white with four black spots on the elytral covers. Eggs are light yellow and are laid deep in the soil. Eggs take 3 to 11 to hatch. Grub is small, apodous fleshy, and yellow in colour. Grub period is about 3 to 42. The final instar pupates in soil in earthen cocoons. The pupation period is 5 to 7 days.

Adults are known to attack brinjal. Common symptom is notching of leaf margins. Grubs generally feed on roots causing wilting.

References 

Curculionidae
Insects of Sri Lanka
Beetles described in 1843